Freycinetia scandens is a species of climbing plant in the family Pandanaceae. Naturally found growing in Papua New Guinea, Malesia and Queensland.

References

scandens
Flora of Papua New Guinea
Flora of Malesia
Flora of Queensland
Flora of the Northern Territory